"Away from Here" is the first single from English rock band the Enemy's debut album, We'll Live and Die in these Towns (2007). It was the band's first single to enter the UK top 10, peaking at number eight on the UK Singles Chart. It is believed this song was inspired by the band's visit to Jersey, Channel Islands.

Track listings
UK CD single
 "Away from Here"
 "Fear Killed the Youth of Our Nation"

UK 7-inch single (Warner Bros.)
A. "Away from Here" – 3:01
B. "Back Like a Heart Attack" – 3:24

UK 7-inch single (Stiff)
A. "Away from Here" – 3:01
B. "A Message to You Rudy" featuring Neville Staple of the Specials – 2:13

Charts

Certifications

References

2007 singles
2007 songs
The Enemy (UK rock band) songs
Warner Records singles